"Kul med jul" is a song by Swedish singer Frans. It was released as a digital download in Sweden on 4 December 2006 through Cardiac Records. The song is included on his debut studio album Da Man (2006). The song has peaked to number 6 on the Swedish Singles Chart.

Track listing

Chart performance

Weekly charts

Release date

References

2006 songs
2006 singles
Frans Jeppsson-Wall songs
Swedish Christmas songs